Hummer is an arcade racing game released by Sega in 2009. The game runs on the Sega Lindbergh platform. There are 2 game modes: Time attack mode and Race mode. In the Race mode, players driving Hummer to race against other opponents. It is possible for up to 8 people to race at the same time. Boosts can be used to speed up during the race.

External links 
 

2009 video games
Arcade video games
Arcade-only video games
Sega arcade games
Racing video games
Video games developed in Japan